The olive-backed oriole (Oriolus sagittatus), or white-bellied oriole, is a very common medium-sized passerine bird native to northern and eastern Australia and south-central New Guinea. The most wide-ranging of the Australasian orioles, it is noisy and conspicuous.

Taxonomy and systematics
The olive-backed oriole was originally described in the genus Coracias by the English ornithologist John Latham in 1801.

Subspecies
Four subspecies are recognized: 
 O. s. magnirostris - van Oort, 1910: Found in south-central New Guinea
 O. s. affinis - Gould, 1848: Originally described as a separate species. Found in north-western and north-central Australia
 O. s. grisescens - Schodde & Mason, IJ, 1999: Found on Cape York Peninsula (north-eastern Australia) and islands of the Torres Strait
 O. s. sagittatus - (Latham, 1801): Found in eastern Australia

Description
Not bright in colour, it is olive-backed with small dark streaks, with a light chest having black streaks. Females have cinnamon-edged wings and both sexes have reddish bills and eyes.

Distribution and habitat
Where the green oriole specialises in damp, thickly vegetated habitats in the tropical far north, the olive-backed oriole is more versatile, preferring more open woodland environments, and tolerating drier climates (but not desert). While common to very common in the north, olive-backed orioles are less frequently seen in the south, but nevertheless reach as far as south-eastern South Australia. Their range is from the very north of Western Australia across the east and south coasts to Victoria and the corner of South Australia. Most birds breed during the tropical wet season, but some migrate south to breed in the southern summer.

References

olive-backed oriole
olive-backed oriole
Birds of Australia
Birds of New Guinea
olive-backed oriole
Articles containing video clips